Allsvenskan 2000, part of the 2000 Swedish football season, was the 76th Allsvenskan season played. The first match was played 8 April 2000 and the last match was played 4 November 2000. Halmstads BK won the league ahead of runners-up Helsingborgs IF, while GAIS and Västra Frölunda IF were relegated.

Summary
A total number of five teams from Göteborg participated: IFK Göteborg, Örgryte IS, BK Häcken, GAIS and Västra Frölunda IF.
From this season, only the team ending up at the 12th position was required to play relegation qualifying games, following the establishment of Superettan.
When Halmstads BK won the Swedish Championship, they became the final team to be awarded the von Rosens pokal. From 2001 it was replaced by Lennart Johanssons Pokal.

Participating clubs

League table

Relegation play-offs

Results

Season statistics

Top scorers

Attendances

Footnotes

References 

Print
 
 
 

Online
 
 

Allsvenskan seasons
Swed
Swed
1